Václav F. Kumpošt (1846–1874) was founder of the magazine Vesmír.

Václav Kumpošt was born in Žamberk and spent his childhood in the family of clockmaker Albert. He grew up there with stepbrother Eduard Albert who was a famous surgeon and with other siblings (František Albert, Tereza Svatová and Kateřina Thomová). He studied medicine on University in Prague and is known as founder of the magazine Vesmír (1871). He died of tuberculosis on 26 February 1874 at general hospital in Prague.

References
Vesmír magazine

1846 births
1874 deaths
People from Žamberk
Czech journalists
19th-century journalists
Male journalists
19th-century male writers
Magazine founders
19th-century deaths from tuberculosis
Tuberculosis deaths in the Czech Republic

cs:Eduard Albert